India Point may refer to:
 Indira Point, formerly called India Point, the southernmost point of India
 India Point Park, in Providence, Rhode Island